The Church of St Peter, St Paul and St John, is the parish church of Llantrisant, Monmouthshire, Wales.  Described by the architectural historian, John Newman as "a handsome church"
in the Decorated style, it is a Grade I listed building as of 18 November 1980.

History and architecture
The church is fourteenth century in origin but nothing remains of this period beyond a single lancet window in the nave. The remainder is of the fifteenth and sixteenth centuries", and of the restoration by E A Landsdowne in 1880–1.

Visiting the church in the 1950s, local historian Fred Hando noted fixed stones, on both the outside of the tower and inside on the wall of the nave, with the inscription 1593 E.R. XXXV. Hando also suggests that, despite the conventional dedication of the church to Peter, Paul and John, a more probable original dedication would have been to ".. the saints known in the Welsh triads as the Blessed visitors of Britain – David, Padarn and Teilo."

There are two bells dated 1662 and 1829. The inner doorway of the porch has a stone that bears a consecration cross. The octagonal font bears the inscription Iohn Iones which is dated 1673.

Behind the pulpit is a marble monument, which comprises a broken Ionic column and an inscription to John Gardner Kemeys  Esquire (see below). The inscription is concluded with two Kemeys pheons and the family motto in Welsh: Duw dy Ras (God thy grace).

On the south wall is a large piscina with a trefoil canopy. The Jacobean communion table is made of oak. There is a decorated window in the north wall. Above the chancel arch are rood-beam and corbels, but there is no trace of the rood-screen.

Externally there is a projection from the nave which would have been the stairway to the rood loft, which may have been blocked up at the time that the Kemeys monument was installed. In the churchyard there is a modern churchyard cross, standing on the original chamfered base with five steps. Above the porch entrance is a sundial dated 1718.

Notes

References
 
 

Grade I listed churches in Monmouthshire
Church in Wales church buildings